Church of South India Trust Association (CSITA) Director board is the highest administrative body of CSI (Church of South India). Synod (CSI Synod) is the annual general meeting of CSI. Moderator of the Synod is a Bishop who is a presiding officer of the election conducted in the Annual General Meeting. The elected board is normally to hold office for three years.

About the Synod
The CSI synod consists of bishops of 24 dioceses, presbyters and layman (both men and women) who are elected from the respective diocesan councils to the synod. The synod members will elect the apex body consisting of a Moderator, Deputy Moderator, general secretary and Treasurer. The Moderator is the spiritual and administrative head of the Church. Only Bishops are eligible to contest for the Moderator and Deputy Moderator posts. Pastors and lay members are eligible to contest for the remaining two posts of general secretary and Treasurer. The ordinary session of the synod is held once every three years. The last synod meeting was held in January 2020 at Tiruchirappalli. The practice has been to hold the meeting during the pongal holidays in mid January and over four days. Special meetings of the synod (between ordinary sessions) could also be convened by a decision of the Synod Executive. The Synod office is situated at CSI Center, Royapettah, Chennai.

Synod Executive
As the Church of South India synod meets only once in every two-year the power of the synod is mostly delegated to Synod Executive which is appointed by the synod and which meets at least twice a year.  The synod executive is a subset of synod which has 95 members. The synod executive consists of 4 members each from the 22 dioceses of Church of South India, 3 nominees of the Moderator and 4 officers of the synod (Moderator, Deputy Moderator, General secretary and Treasurer).

Synod Working Committee
The Synod working committee is a subset of synod executive and it consists of 26 members. The working committee has a representation of one member each from the 22 dioceses of Church of South India and 4 officers of the synod. The synod working committee meetings are held based on need basis and they are held in between synod executive meetings. All the decisions of the synod working committee has to be ratified at a subsequent meeting of the synod executive.

Church of South India Synod Participants

According to the Church of South India constitution the participants in the synod belong to five categories:

Bishops of the 24 dioceses and assistant bishops, if any.
The Outgoing general secretary and treasurer.
Two members of the CSI Order of Sisters,
The President and General secretary of the Women’s Fellowship, 
Presbyters and lay persons representing the various dioceses who are elected by their dioceses to represent them at the synod.
10 members nominated by the moderator

Dioceses send representatives based on a graded scale that starts with those having 10,000 baptised members sending two pastors and four lay persons while the maximum number of representatives to the synod come from dioceses with over 150,000 baptised members that send six presbyters and 11 lay persons.

According to the report of the 2014 synod meeting, there were  135 presbyters, 275 lay members and 22 bishops who participated in the synod. Other invitees to synod meetings include accredited visitors, heads of synod departments, fraternal delegates (representing various CSI affiliated bodies), special invitees, overseas guests and resource persons.

Quorum

The quorum is one-third of the total membership of which not less than two-thirds shall be lay members.

Agenda

First day of the synod meeting consists of confirmation of minutes of the previous Synod, Appointment of various committees to oversee elections, Take up resolutions, moderator's address, general secretary's report and Election of the four Officers of the Synod (Moderator, Deputy Moderator, general secretary and Treasurer). The second, third and fourth days of the Synod consists of a series of presentations by the treasurer, heads of synod departments, special invitees, etc. and some limited question-answer sessions. The final act of each Synod is the formal installation of the new Officers of the Synod on the last day.

Moderator and Deputy Moderator

The current moderator is The Most Reverend A. Dharmaraj Rasalam, Bishop of the South Kerala Diocese (Kerala). The Deputy Moderator is The Right Reverend Dr. K. Reuben Mark, Bishop of the Karimnagar Diocese (Telangana). They were elected for a tenure of three years at the Synod meeting held at Trichy in January, 2020.

Dioceses

Missions and Committee

For proper guidance of the life and work of the Church the CSI Synod has set up various Commissions and Committees. The following are some of the important ones:

Ministerial Committee: which deals with issues relating to the ordained ministry.
Theological Commission: which deals with questions relating to the faith of the Church.
Liturgy Committee: for advising the Church on matters relating to worship and orders of service for different occasions.
Board of Mission and Evangelism: for promoting missionary outreach both within the CSI area and   outside.
Union Negotiations Committee: for negotiations with other churches towards wider union.
Commission on Political Questions: for considering issues of justice and peace from the perspective of the Church's witness to the Gospel.

List of Synod Meetings

See also
Church of South India
Synod
Diocesan Synod

References

External links
 CSI Synod
 CSI All Saint's Church

Church of South India